Parliamentary elections were held in Iceland on 25 June 1978. The Independence Party remained the largest party in the Lower House of the Althing, winning 14 of the 40 seats. Following the election a coalition was formed between the People's Alliance, Social Democratic Party and the Progressive Party with Ólafur Jóhannesson as Prime Minister.

Results

Notes

References

Iceland
Parliament
Elections in Iceland
Parliamentary elections in Iceland
Iceland